Ludwig Schuberth (né Carl Gottfried Schuberth; 18 April 1806 – May 1850) was a German composer.

Career 

Schuberth was born in Magdeburg but spent much of his career in Russia. His works include symphonies, operas, chamber music, art songs, and songs for solo instruments.  He died at St. Petersburg.

References

External links

1806 births
1850 deaths
German opera composers
Male opera composers
19th-century classical composers
German male classical composers
19th-century German composers
19th-century German male musicians